Dark Eyed Messenger is the eighth studio album by Irish singer-songwriter Adrian Crowley. It was released on 27 October 2017 through Chemikal Underground.

Track listing

References

2017 albums
Adrian Crowley albums
Chemikal Underground albums